Life is the twelfth studio album by Australian singer Marcia Hines, released in Australia on 17 November 2007  (see 2007 in music). It peaked at #21 in Australia.

The album is Hines' interpretation of songs originally recorded by artists such as John Lennon, R.E.M and Toni Braxton.

Background
Following the success of her 2006 album, Discothèque, Hines was inducted into the ARIA Hall of Fame. Hines said of the achievement: "I love Australia, but most importantly I'm so happy that I am an Australian."
Hines recorded a new album, titled, "Life". Songs that have she claims have 'helped her survive, and given her strength'.

Hines continued saying; "Everyone's life is remarkable. This album is about the heroism of everyday life. I am still a work in progress, but the life that I dreamed of is each day becoming a reality"

Track listing
CD 

 A limited edition includes a DVD documentary on the making of "Life".

Charts
"Life" debuted and peaked at #21 in Australia.

Weekly Charts

Credits 

Arranged & mixed & produced by – Paul L. Wiltshire
Executive-Producer – Peter Rix, Warren Costello
Additional Production – Andrew Glozer, Brad Evans, Phil Turcio, Victoria Wu
Backing vocals – Jud Field, Natalie Dunn
Bass – Luke Hodgson, Paul Bushnell
Choir – The Melbourne Gospel Choir
Drums – Brian McCloud, Gavin Ford, Tim O'Connor
Guitar – Grecco Buratto, Paul Wiltshire
Piano, Keyboards – Brad Evans, Jim Cox, Paul Wiltshire, Phil Turcio
Saxophone, Flute – Lachlan Davidson
Strings – Caleb Wright, Christina Katsimbardis, Edwina Hookey, Helen Ayres, Helen Ireland, Jonathan Wong, Kate Sullivan, Katherine Lukey, Kathryn Taylor, Kylie Liang, Lucas O'Brian, Michael Brooks Reid, Michael Dahlenburg, Paul Zabrowarny, Rachel Homburg, Steve Newton, Suying Aw, Svetlana Bogosavljevic
Trombone – Ian Bell
Trumpet – Greg Spence, Shane Gillard

References

2007 albums
Marcia Hines albums
Covers albums
Warner Music Group albums